Helcmanovce is a village and municipality in the Gelnica District in the Košice Region of eastern Slovakia. In 2011 total municipality population had been 1490 inhabitants.

See also
 List of municipalities and towns in Slovakia

References

External links
http://en.e-obce.sk/obec/helcmanovce/helcmanovce.html
Official homepage
Surnames of living people in Helcmanovce

Villages and municipalities in Gelnica District